Mary F. Cahill (born 1966) is an American politician from Maine. Cahill, a Democrat from Mattawamkeag, served in the Maine House of Representatives from June 1989 to 1992. She was elected in a special election following the May death of her father Thomas A. Cahill. She was the youngest member of the 114th Maine Legislature.

Personal
Cahill graduated from the University of Maine in Orono. Prior to running for office, she taught third grade in Lincoln, Maine. In November 1991, she became engaged to State Senator Gerard Conley Jr. after meeting during the previous session.

References

1966 births
Living people
People from Penobscot County, Maine
University of Maine alumni
Women state legislators in Maine
Democratic Party members of the Maine House of Representatives